Bruno Eduardo Moraes (born 12 January 1989) is a Brazilian footballer who plays as a forward for Santa Cruz FC.

Career
Born in Bragança Paulista, Moraes began his career on Santo André, and after being deemed surplus to requirements, signed with Porto Alegre. Soon after, he returned to his native state, joining Bragantino. However, after failing to appear with Braga, he was loaned to Ferroviário in March 2012.

In 2013 Moraes signed with Taubaté, and after being the club's topscorer, he signed a contract with Série A outfit Portuguesa on 5 July. He made his top flight debut on the 13th, scoring in a 1–4 defeat to Santos.

Moraes was released by Lusa in December, after the club's relegation. He subsequently represented Red Bull Brasil and Ferroviária before joining Santa Cruz.

On 4 December 2017, after a stint at Dibba, Moraes joined Botafogo-SP.

Honours

Individual
Campeonato Paulista Countryside player of the year: 2018

References

External links
 

1989 births
Living people
Brazilian footballers
Association football forwards
Campeonato Brasileiro Série A players
Campeonato Brasileiro Série B players
Esporte Clube Santo André players
Porto Alegre Futebol Clube players
Clube Atlético Bragantino players
Associação Portuguesa de Desportos players
Red Bull Brasil players
Associação Ferroviária de Esportes players
Santa Cruz Futebol Clube players
Expatriate footballers in the United Arab Emirates
Brazilian expatriate sportspeople in the United Arab Emirates
Dibba FC players
UAE Pro League players
UAE First Division League players
Botafogo Futebol Clube (SP) players
Coritiba Foot Ball Club players
People from Bragança Paulista